Truman Bradley may refer to:

 Truman Bradley (Native American) (1826–1900), Schaghticoke Native American who lived in the village of Nichols Farms in Trumbull, Connecticut
 Truman Bradley (actor) (1905–1974), American actor and narrator in radio, television and film